The Myasishchev M-55 (NATO reporting name: Mystic-B) is a high-altitude reconnaissance aircraft developed by OKB Myasishchev in the Soviet Union, similar in mission to the Lockheed ER-2, but with a twin-boom fuselage and tail surface design. It is a twin-engined development of the Myasishchev M-17 Stratosphera with a higher maximum take-off weight.

Design and development

During the 1950s and 1960s the United States instituted several programs using high-altitude reconnaissance balloons, released over friendly territory to ascend into the jetstream and be transported over the Soviet Union and People's Republic of China.

Subject 34
To combat these high-altitude balloons, Myasishchev proposed Subject 34 a single-seat turbojet-powered twin-boom high-aspect-ratio aircraft. Armament of the single-seat balloon interceptor was to have been two air-air missiles (AAM) and two GSh-23 cannon with 600 rounds per gun in a dorsal turret. Before Subject 34 could be developed into operational hardware, the threat receded due to the success of the Keyhole reconnaissance satellites of the Corona program and the emergence of the Lockheed A-12.

The first prototype of Subject 34 was completed in secret at the Kumertau helicopter plant in Bashkirya, but whilst carrying out taxi tests, in December 1978 piloted by K. V. Chernobrovkin, the prototype Chaika lifted off to avoid hitting snow banks and was destroyed after hitting a hillside in zero visibility.

M-17 Stratosphera

The design of the Chaika was adapted as a reconnaissance aircraft and emerged as the Myasishchev M-17 Stratosphera with a revised airframe, including straight tapered wings with 2° 30' anhedral (0° at 1g), shorter fuselage pod and unreheated Kolesov RD-36-51 turbojet engine. Flown for the first time on 26 May 1982, the M-17 prototype (regn CCCP 17401) was soon allocated the NATO reporting name Mystic-A and was used for investigating the Ozone layer over Antarctica in 1992.

The M-17 also set a total of 12 FAI world records, 5 of which still stand.

M-55 Geophysica
The M-17 balloon-interceptor-based model was terminated in 1987 and replaced by the M-17RN, later known as the M-55 Geophysica, which was dubbed by NATO Mystic-B. First flown on 16 Aug 1988, the M-55 airframe was revised further with a longer fuselage pod, housing two Soloviev D-30-10V un-reheated (non-afterburner) turbofan engines, shorter-span wings and comprehensive sensor payload.

A dual-control version, the M-55UTS, was developed by adding a second cockpit behind the original, displacing some avionics and/or sensor payload.

A number of M-55 Geophysica remain in service, performing in research roles; one M-55 took part in a study of the Arctic stratosphere in 1996–1997, with similar experiments performed in Antarctica during 1999.

An Irish-headquartered company Qucomhaps, with a focus on South East Asia, has entered a 1-billion USD deal to use the M-55 as a high-altitude platform station for digital communications.

Variants
Subject 34 The prototype of a high-altitude balloon interceptor, dubbed Chaika (Gull), was completed in secret at the Kumertau helicopter plant in Bashkirya.
M-17 Stratosphera A reconnaissance version of Subject 34, given the NATO reporting name Mystic-A, powered by a single Kolesov RD-36-51 turbojet engine. At least two M-17 aircraft were built.
M-17RN Initial designation of what was to become the M-55.
M-55 Geophysica A refined version of the M-17 powered by two Soloviev D-30-10V unreheated turbofans, carrying a wide variety of sensors for Earth-sciences research. Five M-55 aircraft were built, including one M-55UTS.
M-55Sh Proposed ground attack variant. Not built. 
M-55UTS A dual-control trainer version of the M-55 with a second cockpit directly aft of the forward cockpit, displacing some of the avionic/sensor payload, otherwise identical to the M-55.
Geophysica 2 a more advanced Earth-sciences research aircraft derived from the M-55, but not proceeded with.

Operators
 
 Soviet Air Force
 
 Russian Air Force

Specifications (M-55)

See also

References

Further reading

External links

 Manufacturer's Web site
 Aviation.ru
 Flugzeuginfo.net (M-17/M-55 Specifications)
 Photos on russianplanes.net
 Photos on airliners.net

Myasishchev aircraft
1980s Soviet military reconnaissance aircraft
Twinjets
Twin-boom aircraft
Aircraft first flown in 1988